Finland participated in the Eurovision Song Contest 2000 with the song "A Little Bit" written by Luca Genta and Gerrit aan't Goor. The song was performed by Nina Åström. The Finnish broadcaster Yleisradio (Yle) returned to the Eurovision Song Contest after a one-year absence following their relegation from 1999 as one of the six countries with the least average points over the preceding five contests. Yle organised the national final Euroviisut 2000 in order to select the Finnish entry for the 2000 contest in Stockholm, Sweden. 12 entries were selected to compete in the national final, which consisted of a semi-final and a final, taking place in January and February 2000. The top six from the semi-final, as selected solely by a public vote, advanced to the final. Six entries competed in the final on 12 January where the 50/50 combination of votes from a ten-member expert jury and votes from the public selected "A Little Bit" performed by Nina Åström as the winner.

Finland competed in the Eurovision Song Contest which took place on 13 May 2000. Performing during the show in position 20, Finland placed eighteenth out of the 24 participating countries, scoring 18 points.

Background 

Prior to the 2000 contest, Finland had participated in the Eurovision Song Contest thirty-five times since its first entry in 1961. Finland's best result in the contest achieved in 1973 where the song "Tom Tom Tom" performed by Marion Rung placed sixth. The Finnish national broadcaster, Yleisradio (Yle), broadcasts the event within Finland and organises the selection process for the nation's entry. Finland's entries for the Eurovision Song Contest have been selected through national final competitions that have varied in format over the years. Since 1961, a selection show that was often titled Euroviisukarsinta highlighted that the purpose of the program was to select a song for Eurovision. The broadcaster selected the Finnish entry for the 2000 contest again through the Euroviisut selection show.

Before Eurovision

Euroviisut 2000 
Euroviisut 2000 was the national final that selected Finland's entry for the Eurovision Song Contest 2000. The competition consisted of two stages that commenced with the semi-final in January 2000 and concluded with a final on 12 February 2000. The final was broadcast on Yle TV1.

Format 
The format of the competition consisted of two stages: a semi-final and a final. Twelve songs competed in the semi-final and the top six entries from the semi-final qualified to the final. The results for the semi-finals were determined exclusively by a public vote, while the results in the final were determined by public voting and jury voting. Public voting included the options of telephone and postcard voting. Prior to the final, the public was able to vote a week in advance.

Competing entries 
A panel of experts appointed by Yle selected twelve entries for the competition from the 211 submissions received during a submission period and from composers directly invited by Yle. Six of the competing entries came from the open submission, while the remaining six entries came from the invited composers. The competing entries were announced on 28 December 1999.

Shows

Semi-final 
The twelve competing entries in the semi-final were presented on Yle Radio Suomi between 2 and 9 January 2000. The top six from the twelve entries qualified to the final based on the results from the public vote held until 11 January 2000 and announced on 15 January 2000 during the Yle TV1 programme Hotelli Sointu. 8,062 votes were cast in the semi-final.

Final 
The final took place on 12 February 2000 at the Lord Hotel in Helsinki, hosted by Finnish presenters Jani Juntunen and Silvia Modig. The six entries that qualified from the preceding semi-final competed and "A Little Bit" performed by Nina Åström was selected as the winner by a 50/50 combination of public votes and a ten-member jury. The viewers and the juries each had a total of 210 points to award. Each juror distributed their points as follows: 1, 2, 3, 4, 5 and 6 points, while the viewer vote distributed their points as follows: 10, 20, 30, 40, 50 and 60 points. 40,275 votes were cast in the final. In addition to the performances of the competing entries, the interval act featured 1989 Finnish Eurovision entrant Anneli Saaristo.

Ratings

At Eurovision 
According to Eurovision rules, the 24-country participant list for the contest was composed of: the previous year's winning country and host nation Sweden, "Big Four" countries, the thirteen countries, which had obtained the highest average points total over the preceding five contests, and any eligible countries which did not compete in the 1999 contest. A special allocation draw was held which determined the running order and Finland was set to perform in position 20, following the entry from Macedonia and before the entry from Latvia. Finland finished in eighteenth place with 18 points.

The show was televised in Finland on YLE TV1 with commentary by Jani Juntunen. The show was also broadcast via radio with commentary by Iris Mattila and Tarja Närhi on Yle Radio Suomi. The Finnish spokesperson, who announced the Finnish votes during the final, was Pia Mäkinen.

Voting 
Below is a breakdown of points awarded to Finland and awarded by Finland in the contest. The nation awarded its 12 points to Latvia in the contest.

References

External links
  Full national final on Yle Elävä Arkisto

2000
Countries in the Eurovision Song Contest 2000
Eurovision
Eurovision